Emblemantha is a genus of flowering plants belonging to the family Primulaceae.

Its native range is Sumatera.

Species:
 Emblemantha urnulata B.C.Stone

References

Primulaceae
Primulaceae genera